Alexander Lund Hansen (born 6 October 1982) is a Norwegian former footballer.

Career
He came to Rosenborg from local team Nardo in 2001. In parts of 2004 and 2005 he was on loan to Fredrikstad, where he played 19 matches. He played in six matches for Rosenborg in the Royal League in late 2006, where Rosenborg only got one point. He made his league debut for Rosenborg against Viking in the 1–0 win 23 July 2008.

On 13 November 2009, he signed a contract with Danish Odense, and joined the squad on 1 January 2010.

On 26 November 2010 he signed with IK Start, and joined the club on a free transfer on 1 January 2011. He returned to Rosenborg in August 2012.

After struggling to come back after receiving a concussion for the fifth time in not that many years, Lund Hansen was forced to retire at the end of the 2016 season. However, he will stay at Rosenborg, starting as a goalkeeping coach for the Rosenborg academy.

Career statistics

Honours

Club
Rosenborg
Norwegian Premier League Championship: 2006, 2009, 2015
Norwegian Football Cup: 2015

References

External links
Player profile, rosenborg.info.

1982 births
Living people
People from Åfjord
Association football goalkeepers
Norwegian footballers
Rosenborg BK players
Fredrikstad FK players
Odense Boldklub players
Eliteserien players
Danish Superliga players
Norwegian First Division players
Norwegian expatriate footballers
Expatriate men's footballers in Denmark
Norwegian expatriate sportspeople in Denmark
Sportspeople from Trøndelag